Vangaon is a village in the Palghar district of Maharashtra, India. It is located in the Dahanu taluka.

Education 
The Vangaon Educational Society operates various educational institutions in Vangaon:
Baijnathsingh Mahadevsingh Thakur English Medium School – nursery to Standard 10
Jagmohan Mahadevsingh Thakur High school – offers Standard 5 to Standard 10, with hostel facilities for Aadivasi students 
Rajendrasingh Thakur College

There is one govt operated industrial training institute, providing training for various industry courses such as, welding, turning, CNC machine etc.
Students across the district enroll in this institute to gain technical and practical knowledge.

Culture 
There are public temples in Vangaon such as Mahadev, Hanuman Temple, Dattatraya, as well as two private temples Radha Raman Mandir & Gayatri Mandir.

Several festivals are celebrated in the village.  Ganeshotsav or Ganesh Chaturthi is the most-popular festival in Maharashtra. Navaratri festivals are organized by Navratri Mahotsav Mandal and Jatras are organized every year at the Mahadev Temple at Datta Mandir during Datta Jayanti. Festivals are also organized at Hanuman Mandir during Hanuman Jayanti.

Vangaon has a weekly Sunday market offering groceries, apparel, and food items.

Cuisine 
Vangaon is well known for chikoo, made from sapodilla fruit, capsicum, tomatoes and coconuts.

Industrial area and power stations 
Tarapur Maharashtra Industrial Development Corporation (MIDC), Tarapur Atomic Power Station, and a Reliance Energy thermal power station are located near the village. Tarapur MIDC hosts specialty chemicals, bulk pharmaceuticals, steel, alloy, and textile manufacturing companies.

Public transport 
The primary modes of transportation are trains, auto rickshaws and state transport buses (Maharashtra State Transport Corporation).

Demographics 
According to the 2011 census of India, Vangaon has 1,645 households. The effective literacy rate (i.e. the literacy rate of population excluding children aged 6 and below) is 82.4%.

References 

Villages in Dahanu taluka